Marcelo Urbano (born 2 October 1965) is a former Argentine rugby union player. He played as a prop.

Urbano played for Buenos Aires Cricket & Rugby Club.

He had 7 caps for Argentina, from 1991 to 1995, without scoring. He was called for the 1995 Rugby World Cup, but he never played.

References

External links

1965 births
Living people
Argentine rugby union players
Argentina international rugby union players
Rugby union props